Dexter Toppin (born 10 July 1957) is a South African cricketer. He played in eleven first-class and four List A matches for Border in 1988/89 and 1989/90.

See also
 List of Border representative cricketers

References

External links
 

1957 births
Living people
South African cricketers
Border cricketers
People from Saint Philip, Barbados